FC Moush Kasagh, is a defunct Armenian football club from the village of Kasagh, Kotayk Province. The club was formed in 1998 and participated in the Armenian First League during the same season. After spending 2 years in the First League, the club was dissolved prior to the 2000 season kick-off.

League record

References

Association football clubs established in 1998
Association football clubs disestablished in 2000
Moush Kasagh
1998 establishments in Armenia
2000 disestablishments in Armenia